Ernest Marc Louis de Gonzague Doudart de Lagrée (March 31, 1823 – March 12, 1868) was the leader of the French Mekong Expedition of 1866-1868. 

He was born in Saint-Vincent-de-Mercuze near Grenoble, France, and graduated from the École Polytechnique.  He joined the navy and served in the Crimean War, then took up a post in Indochina in the hope that the climate would help his chronically ulcerated throat. It did not, and throughout the Mekong expedition he was often in severe pain.

The expedition left Saigon on June 5, 1866. In addition to his ulcers, Doudart de Lagrée suffered from fever, amoebic dysentery and infected wounds caused by leeches, as the expeditioners had to walk barefoot once they had worn out their supply of shoes. By the time the expedition reached Dongchuan, in Yunnan, China, he was too sick to be moved, and his second-in-command Francis Garnier took command. Garnier led the expedition to Dali, leaving Doudart de Lagrée in the care of the doctor. He died from an abscess on his liver. The doctor removed his heart to return it to France, while Doudart de Lagrée was buried in Dongchuan.

Ernest Doudart de Lagrée was also an entomologist. Insect collections made by him in Africa are conserved in Muséum national d'histoire naturelle in Paris.

Honours 
 Three ships of the French Navy were named in his honour, notably the Doudart de Lagrée (F 728)
 Three stamps of French Indochina were issued in his honour in 1944-45, in the values of 1, 15 and 40 centimes.

See also
Mekong Expedition of 1866-1868

References
Milton Osborne. 2000. The Mekong, Turbulent Past, Uncertain Future Atlantic Monthly Press, New York. 

French explorers
Explorers of Asia
1823 births
1868 deaths
French entomologists
French military leaders
French military personnel of the Crimean War
People of French Indochina
1860s in Vietnam
19th-century French military personnel
19th-century explorers